Mabhuti Khanyeza, (born 17 June 1982 in Howick) is a retired South African association football striker.

Career
Khanyeza's arrival from Lamontville Golden Arrows in July 2007 after he had spent five seasons at the KwaZulu-Natal based team and scored 43 goals in the 102 official league and cup matches that he had participated in between 2002 and 2007, was according to many commentators bound to happen sooner or later.

And for some it was inevitable that the soft-spoken man from the rural areas of KwaZulu-Natal would eventually don the gold and black strip of The Amakhosi. Khenyeza was a major hit on his official debut for Chiefs on the opening night of the 2007–2008 season, after coming close to scoring as he was unfortunate to have hit the cross bar twice in the game.

He managed to find the back of the net against Benoni Premier United from the penalty spot in the final minute of the game, which gave him a goal on debut. Often thought of as one of the players who has perhaps not represented his country as regularly as he should have, Khanyeza's move to Chiefs is a step in the right direction as apart from the possibility of adding silverware to his cupboards he has put himself in a stronger position to receive more national team call ups.

Thus far the player who made his name at Lamontville Golden Arrows will be remembered for his wonder goal against Chiefs arch rivals Orlando Pirates in November 2007, a goal he scored just nineteen seconds into the game.

Ajax Cape Town
Khenyeza moved to Ajax CT in 2008 after he fell out with Kaizer Chiefs coach Muhsin Ertugral. He arrive as a free agent and he was one of the top scorer of 2008–2009 season. At the end of the season left the club and signed for Mamelodi Sundowns.

Mamelodi Sundowns
Since his arrival Khenyeza had become a regular first team player in the team. He had 10 goals and 9 assists in 57 games.

Supersport United
After leaving Mamelodi Sundowns for free in January 2012 he signed for Supersport United. On total he played 22 games for the club, fifteen of whom as a starter. He scored four goals and provided three assists.

Ajax Cape Town
Khenyeza rejoined Ajax CT in January 2013.

References

1982 births
Living people
People from uMngeni Local Municipality
Zulu people
South African soccer players
Association football forwards
South Africa international soccer players
Lamontville Golden Arrows F.C. players
Kaizer Chiefs F.C. players
Cape Town Spurs F.C. players
Mamelodi Sundowns F.C. players
SuperSport United F.C. players
AmaZulu F.C. players